Mirny is a rural locality (a settlement) in Beloselskoye Rural Settlement of Krasnogvardeysky District, Adygea, Russia. The population was 10 as of 2018. There are 2 streets.

Geography 
Mirny is located 12 km south of Krasnogvardeyskoye (the district's administrative centre) by road. Papenkov is the nearest rural locality.

References 

Rural localities in Krasnogvardeysky District